20 Golden Greats may refer to:

20 Golden Greats (The Beach Boys album), 1976
20 Golden Greats (The Shadows album), 1977
20 Golden Greats (Buddy Holly & The Crickets album), 1978
20 Golden Greats (Nat King Cole album), 1978
20 Golden Greats (Creedence Clearwater Revival album), 1979
20 Golden Greats (Diana Ross album), 1979
Glen Campbell's Twenty Golden Greats, 1976
Diana Ross & the Supremes: 20 Golden Greats (The Supremes album), 1977
The Hollies: 20 Golden Greats 1978
20 Golden Greats (Gary Lewis & The Playboys album)